Elections to the United States House of Representatives were held in Pennsylvania on October 9, 1798, for the 6th Congress.

Background
Thirteen Representatives (7 Democratic-Republicans and 6 Federalists) had been elected in 1796.  One seat had changed from Federalist to Democratic-Republican in a special election in 1797.  Two more seats, one held by a Democratic-Republican and one by a Federalist, had become vacant in August, 1798, and were still vacant at the time of the 1798 elections

Congressional districts
Pennsylvania was divided into 12 districts, one of which (the ) was a plural district, with 2 Representatives.  These districts remained in use until redistricting after the Census of 1800.  
The  consisted of the City of Philadelphia
The  consisted of Philadelphia County
The  consisted of Chester and Delaware Counties
The  (2 seats) consisted of Montgomery, Bucks and Northampton Counties
The  consisted of Berks and Luzerne County
The  consisted of Northumberland and Dauphin Counties
The  consisted of Lancaster County
The  consisted of York County
The  consisted of Mifflin and Cumberland County
The  consisted of Bedford, Huntingdon and Franklin Counties
The  consisted of Westmoreland and Fayette Counties
The  consisted of Allegheny and Washington Counties

The counties that made up the 5th district did not border each other.  That district was therefore made up of two separate pieces rather than being a single contiguous entity

Note: Many of these counties covered much larger areas than they do today, having since been divided into numerous counties. The boundaries of the districts are based on the counties' 1790 borders.

Election results
There were two vacancies and 11 incumbents at the time of the 1798 elections. The two vacancies were filled by special elections held at the same time as the general election. The remaining 9 incumbents (5 Democratic-Republicans and 4 Federalists) ran for re-election.  8 Democratic-Republicans and 5 Federalists were elected, a net increase of 1 seat for the Democratic-Republicans over the 1796 elections.

Special election
Thomas Hartley (F) of the 8th district died on December 21, 1800.  A special election was held January 15, 1801 to fill the vacancy.

Stewart had already been elected in the 1800 elections

See also 
 United States House of Representatives elections, 1798 and 1799
 List of United States representatives from Pennsylvania

References
Electoral data are from the Wilkes University Election Statistics Project

1798
Pennsylvania
United States House of Representatives